The 1932 Louisville Cardinals football team was an American football team that represented the University of Louisville as a member of the Southern Intercollegiate Athletic Association (SIAA) during the 1932 college football season. In their first and only season under head coach C. V. Money, the Cardinals compiled a 0–9 record. 

Louisville's 1932 season was part of a 24-game losing streak dating back to October 2, 1931.

Schedule

References

Louisville
Louisville Cardinals football seasons
Louisville Cardinals football